Marcus Aurelius Goodrich (November 28, 1897 – October 20, 1991) was an American screenwriter and novelist.

Biography
He was the first husband of the actress Olivia de Havilland. Their only son Benjamin was born on September 27, 1949. He was married beforehand to Elizabeth Norton, Henriette Alice McCrea-Metcalf, Caroline Sleeth, and Renee Oakman.

He associated with the Ernest Hemingway group in Paris and was a protégé of Philip Wylie. He is best known for his 1941 novel Delilah.

References

External links

1897 births
1991 deaths
American male screenwriters
Burials at Arlington National Cemetery
De Havilland family
20th-century American novelists
Writers from San Antonio
American male novelists
20th-century American male writers
Novelists from Texas
Screenwriters from Texas
20th-century American screenwriters